Khariapipra Halt railway station is a halt railway station on Sahibganj loop line under the Malda railway division of Eastern Railway zone. It is situated beside National Highway 80 at Kharia in Munger district in the Indian state of Bihar.

References

Railway stations in Munger district
Malda railway division